Snowboarding at the 2022 Winter Olympics were held at the Genting Snow Park in Zhangjiakou and Big Air Shougang in Beijing, China. The events took place between 5 and 15 February 2022. A total of 11 snowboarding events will be held.

In July 2018, the International Olympic Committee (IOC) officially added the mixed team snowboard cross event to the Olympic program, increasing the total number of events to 11.

A total of 238 quota spots were distributed to the sport of snowboarding, a decline of 20 from the 2018 Winter Olympics. A total of 11 events were contested, five for men, five for women and one mixed.

Qualification

A total of 238 athletes qualified to compete in the snowboarding events (119 men and 119 women). A country can enter a maximum of 26 athletes across all events, with a maximum of 14 per gender. A total of eight quotas (one per event) is reserved for the host nation, if it fails to qualify in that respective event. Each event also has a minimum FIS points total required per athlete, along with a top 30 finish at a World Cup event during the qualification period (1 July 2019 or 2020 in Parallel giant slalom, to 16 January 2022), or 2021 FIS Snowboarding World Championships. A total of 16 NOC's will qualify for the mixed team snowboard cross event. The athlete quota per event is listed below.

Big air and slopestyle have a combined event quota.

Competition schedule
The following is the competition schedule for all eleven events.

Sessions that included the event finals are shown in bold.

All times are (UTC+8).

Medal summary
Austria and the United States won the most gold medals at these Games, with three apiece, while Canada led the overall standings with six medals.

Medal table

Medalists

Men's events

Women's events

Mixed

Participating nations
A total of 233 athletes (119 men and 114 women) from 31 nations (including the IOC's designation of ROC for the Russian Olympic Committee) qualified to participate. Hungary and Malta made their Olympic sport debuts.

The numbers in parenthesis represents the number of participants entered.

References

External links
Official Results Book – Snowboard

Snowboarding at the 2022 Winter Olympics
2022
2022 Winter Olympics events
Winter Olympics